Helen Katharine Bond  (born 1968) is a British Professor of Christian Origins and New Testament. She has written many books related to Pontius Pilate, Jesus and Judaism.

Biography
Bond born in 1968 and raised in the North East of England she attended Durham High School She read biblical studies at the Durham University, University of Tübingen, and the University of St Andrews. At Durham, she completed her PhD on Pontius Pilate under the supervision of James Dunn.

From 1996 to 2000 Bond taught New Testament at the University of Aberdeen, and since 2000 has taught at the University of Edinburgh.

Since 2011, Bond has served as Director of the Centre for the Study of Christian Origins and, since 2018, she has been Head of the School of Divinity, University of Edinburgh.

She is a member of the Church of Scotland (Falkirk Old Parish Church) and is married to Keith Raffan. Together, they have two children, Katriona and Scott.

Bond was elected a Fellow of the Royal Society of Edinburgh in March 2021.

Works
1998 – Pontius Pilate in History and Interpretation
2004 – Caiaphas: Friend of Rome and Judge of Jesus?
2007 – Israel’s God and Rebecca’s Children: Christology and Community in Early Judaism and Christianity
2012 – The Historical Jesus: A Guide for the Perplexed
2018 – Jesus: A Very Brief History
2020 – The Bible On TV
2020 – The First Biography Of Jesus: Genre and Meaning in Mark's Gospel

References

20th-century births
Living people
British biblical scholars
Academics of the University of Aberdeen
Academics of the University of Edinburgh
Alumni of the University of St Andrews
Alumni of Durham University
University of Tübingen alumni
Year of birth missing (living people)
Place of birth missing (living people)
Fellows of the Royal Society of Edinburgh